Opinion 2027 is a 2003 ruling of the International Commission on Zoological Nomenclature (ICZN) concerning the conservation of 17 species names of wild animals with domestic derivatives. Opinion 2027 is in response to Case 3010 and subsequent comments.

The 17 names involved:
Bombyx mandarina
Bos gaurus
Bos mutus
Bos primigenius
Bubalus arnee
Camelus ferus
Canis lupus
Capra aegagrus
Carassius gibelio
Cavia aperea
Equus africanus
Equus ferus
Felis silvestris
Lama guanicoe
Mustela putorius
Ovis orientalis
Vicugna vicugna

The opinion of the commission was that "the "name of a wild species...is not invalid by virtue of being predated by the name based on a domestic form." These 17 species of wild animals were named later than the relevant domestic animals, hence the use of the ICZN provision for conservation. The names of the 17 species were added to the Official Lists and Indexes of Names in Zoology of the ICZN, which means that they are valid taxa.

References 

Zoological nomenclature
2003 in biology
2003 documents
African wild ass